St. John's Catholic Church is a historic Roman Catholic church of the Diocese of Toledo on the Allen County side of Delphos, Ohio, United States.  Designed by S.W. Lane, it has been recognized as a historic site because of its architecture.

Parish history
St. John's Parish was established in 1842 by German Catholic settlers who had immigrated from Osnabrück.  Although the church was afflicted by a cholera epidemic in 1854, it grew to the point that it was split into two parishes, with the members in Landeck being erected into a separate parish.  Land was donated for the construction of the present church building by Frederick Bredeick; construction began in 1879 and concluded in the following year.  As the village of Delphos grew with the Miami and Erie Canal, the parish's prosperity likewise increased; like St. Michael's Catholic Church in Shelby County to the south, the church's architecture demonstrates the wealth that came from the commerce along the canal.

Architecture

Interior
Leading features of the church's interior include a prominent rib vault, two rows of columns in the nave that are topped with Corinthian capitals, and an altar built to resemble that of Rome's Basilica di San Clemente.  Architectural experts have deemed the interior unmatched in western Ohio.

Exterior
Outside, the church's exterior is also striking.  Although many large Catholic churches are located in western Ohio, they are more typically built in the Gothic Revival style – several counties in far western Ohio have been nicknamed the "Land of the Cross-Tipped Churches" because of the dominance of Gothic Revival churches in the region – and such a large Romanesque Revival church is unique.  It fills an entire city block, and its tower is by far the most prominent part of the community's skyline; accordingly, it has been likened to a cathedral.

Recognition
In 1980, St. John's Church was listed on the National Register of Historic Places because of its architectural significance.  It is the only church on the National Register in Allen County, and one of three buildings in Delphos so to be recognized.

References

External links

Parish website

German-American culture in Ohio
Roman Catholic churches completed in 1880
19th-century Roman Catholic church buildings in the United States
Buildings and structures in Allen County, Ohio
National Register of Historic Places in Allen County, Ohio
Churches on the National Register of Historic Places in Ohio
Religious organizations established in 1842
Churches in the Roman Catholic Diocese of Toledo
Romanesque Revival church buildings in Ohio
Tourist attractions in Allen County, Ohio
1842 establishments in Ohio
Delphos, Ohio